Loano is a comune (municipality) in the Province of Savona in the Italian region Liguria, located about  southwest of Genoa and about  southwest of Savona.

Loano borders the following municipalities: Bardineto, Boissano, Borghetto Santo Spirito, and Pietra Ligure.

History
Loano has pre-Roman origins (prehistoric finds at the San Damiano hill and pre-Roman at the current old city are recent), during the Roman era the villas was built in this territory; a Roman mosaic of the imperial age is visible on the main floor of Palazzo Doria.

In the 8th century, thanks to a Carolingian donation, the territory called Lovenis (corresponding to the first Loanese toponym) was donated to the Benedictine monastery of San Pietro in Varatella (Toirano) who founded the church-sanctuary of Nostra Signora di Loreto near the port.

Twin towns
  Francheville, France, since 1998

References

External links
 Official website

Cities and towns in Liguria